Palmers Green High School is a private girls' day school located in Hoppers Road, Palmers Green, North London. It consists of four divisions: The Alice Nursery (ages 3–4), Preparatory (Years 1-2), Junior School (Years 3-6) and the Senior School. It does not have a sixth form.

History

The school was founded by Alice Hum, who belonged to the Society of Friends, on 8 May 1905 in 1 Osborne Road, Palmers Green with twelve pupils, eight of whom were in the Kindergarten. In 1907, it expanded by taking the adjoining house on Green Lanes.  After a third house was taken, the boy pupils were moved to Avondale Hall, which had been used as a school for girls from 1909-1910.

In 1918, by which time it had 300 pupils and the Boys' School had been phased out, it moved to its current site, Avondale Hall, in Hoppers Road. It has since been extended on that site.

After the outbreak of the Second World War, it continued to provide full-time education and temporarily shared its site with its co-foundation Keble School.

Admissions

Palmers Green is a selective school and the selection process includes assessment, which is in the form of an examination for the senior school, and an interview. A documentary film with the title 'Modern Times: Testing Times' was produced in 1997, showing how some families approached this selection process.

Academics
Palmers Green is one Enfield's top performing independent schools. In 2013 PGHS was No.1 in the Sunday Times Parent Power League Table for Small Independent Schools for the fourth year running. The Lower School, R-year 6, is in the top 50 independent prep schools in the country. The School made the top 100 schools in the country in terms of GCSE results.

Curriculum
Pupils can currently choose from the following options of GCSE choices:
History
Geography
French
Art
Drama
Spanish
ICT
Music
As well as the compulsory subjects; English Language, English Literature, Mathematics, Dual Science Award and a Modern Foreign Language.

Age groups

The Nursery for girls from 3–4 years of age is on a separate site. The Preparatory and Junior Departments for girls from four to eleven and the Senior School for girls up to sixteen years old are on the main site.

Notable former pupils

Stevie Smith, poet and novelist
Dame Flora Robson, actress
Kathryn Prescott, actress
Megan Prescott, actress

References

External links
School Website
ISI Inspection Reports
Charity Commission Report
Independent Schools Directory
Profile on the ISC website
Profile on MyDaughter

Educational institutions established in 1905
Girls' schools in London
Private schools in the London Borough of Enfield
Private girls' schools in London
Member schools of the Girls' Schools Association
Quaker schools in England
Palmers Green
1905 establishments in England